The 2015 ICC World Twenty20 Qualifier, for the 2016 World Twenty20, was held from 6 to 26 July 2015. The tournament was hosted by both Ireland and Scotland. 51 matches were played among 14 nations, down from 72 matches among 16 nations previously. The tournament formed part of the ICC World Twenty20 Qualifier series, with the top six teams going forward to the qualifying round of the 2016 ICC World Twenty20 tournament.

Matches where both teams had T20I status were recorded as a Twenty20 International match. The teams in this tournament with this status were Scotland, Ireland, Netherlands, Afghanistan, United Arab Emirates, Hong Kong, Nepal and Papua New Guinea. Matches which featured one or two teams without T20I status were recorded as a Twenty20 match.

Scotland were the first team to qualify for the 2016 ICC World Twenty20 tournament by finishing top of Group B. Co-hosts Ireland joined them by finishing top of Group A. Joining the two group winners through the qualifier matches were the Netherlands, Afghanistan Hong Kong, and Oman. It was the first time that Oman qualified for a major ICC event and with their win over Namibia, they gained T20I status. The UAE and Nepal who made their debut in the 2014 ICC World Twenty20 did not qualify, however the UAE did play in the 2016 Asia Cup which for the first time was played in a Twenty20 format.

Scotland and the Netherlands shared the trophy after the final was abandoned without a ball being bowled due to rain. The Netherlands were the only associate nation to advance past the group stage in the 2014 ICC World Twenty20 tournament.

Teams

Format
From the 14 teams, the top 6 qualifiers will progress to the first (qualifying) round of the 2016 ICC World Twenty20, where they will meet the ninth and tenth-ranked full members (Bangladesh and Zimbabwe) in the ICC T20I Championship table as on 30 April 2014. The teams for the two groups along with the fixtures were announced on 14 May.

Squads

Scotland's Kyle Coetzer was not originally included in the 15-man squad, but was added on 10 June after Freddie Coleman withdrew due to personal circumstances. America's Steven Taylor withdrew from the squad on 22 June after securing a contract with Barbados Tridents in the Caribbean Premier League (CPL). He was replaced by Timothy Surujbally. On 2 July Hong Kong's Waqas Barkat was replaced by Giacomo Lamplough after Barkat was ruled out due to visa issues. Canada's Nikhil Dutta chose to stay with the St Kitts and Nevis Patriots in the CPL and was replaced by Hiral Patel. South African born Roelof van der Merwe obtained a Dutch passport a month before the tournament started and was selected over Vivian Kingma. Namibia's Zhivago Groenewald was replaced by Michau du Preez. Oman's Khawar Ali returned home for personal reasons midway through the tournament, and was replaced by Arun Poulose in their squad. However, Ali returned for the 5th place play-off match against Afghanistan, and in turn made his T20I debut.

Dutch bowler Ahsan Malik was reported for bowling with an illegal action following the Netherlands win over Scotland on 11 July. He was not allowed to take any further part in the tournament, until an independent assessment has taken place. Kenyan bowler James Ngoche was also suspended for bowling with an illegal action. This was following Kenya's match with Oman on 11 July. Along with Malik, Ngoche undertook an independent assessment. Hong Kong spin bowler Nizakat Khan was suspended for bowling with an illegal action, following Hong Kong's match against Nepal on 15 July. He too underwent an independent assessment. On 23 July Namibia's Jason Davidson was suspended for using an illegal action in their match against the Netherlands. He also underwent an assessment on his bowling.

Venues

Warm-up matches

Fixtures

Group A

Group B

Playoffs

Bracket

Qualifier 1

Qualifier 2

Qualifier 3

Qualifier 4

Semifinal 1

5th Place Playoff

Semifinal 2

3rd Place Playoff

Final

Final standings

 Qualified for the 2016 ICC World Twenty20 and 2019 ICC T20 World Cup Qualifier.

Notes

References

External links
 Series home at ESPN Cricinfo

2016 ICC World Twenty20
International cricket competitions in 2015
ICC Men's T20 World Cup Qualifier
International cricket competitions in Ireland
International cricket competitions in Scotland